The San Andres Mountains are a mountain range in the southwestern U.S. state of New Mexico, in the counties of Socorro, Sierra, and Doña Ana.

Geography
Though nearly contiguous with the Organ Mountains to the south, separated by St. Augustine Pass (elevation ) and U.S. Highway 70, the two are very distinct geologically and botanically. The Oscura Mountains to the north are separated from the San Andres Mountains by Mockingbird Gap (elevation ) and the much lower Little Burro Mountains. The San Andres Mountains are comparatively dry and do not support extensive woodlands. They are mostly closed to the public, lying almost entirely within the restricted White Sands Missile Range.

Geology
The San Andres Mountains form part of the eastern edge of the rift valley of the Rio Grande, and are made up of west-dipping fault blocks made primarily of San Andres Formation limestone, but also with extensive exposures of reddish Abo Formation sandstone on the western side, and quartz monzonite on the eastern side.   Gypsum deposits washed from these mountains are the main source of the dunes in White Sands National Park.

Significant summits include:

Desert bighorn sheep
The biggest and best desert bighorn sheep habitat in New Mexico is in the San Andres Mountains, which can host up to 400 bighorn. In the mid-1970s there were around 200 sheep in the refuge; however, in 1979, a scabies mite epizootic reduced the population from 200 to 75. Subsequent years brought further declines from scabies and other causes until the population consisted of one ewe in 1997. Reintroduction of desert bighorn sheep occurred in 2002 and the herd has now about 80 members.

References

"San Andres Mountains". Peakbagger.com. Retrieved June 3, 2005.
"San Andres Mountains" New Mexico Tourism Department, as of December 9, 2006, via Internet Archive
"San Andres Mountains". Encyclopædia Britannica, online edition. Retrieved June 3, 2005.

 
Mountain ranges of Doña Ana County, New Mexico
Tularosa Basin
Mountain ranges of Sierra County, New Mexico
Mountain ranges of Socorro County, New Mexico